Abdeljalil Zaim Idriss Medioub (Arabic: عبد الجليل زعيم إدريس مديوب ; born 28 August 1997) is a professional footballer who plays as a defender for Cypriot First Division club Aris Limassol. Born in France, he plays for the Algeria national team.

Club career
Medioub was a youth product at Marseille, and spent his early career in various reserve teams in Spain. In 2019, he moved to Dinamo Tbilisi on loan and began his professional career there. He then joined the reserve side of Bordeaux, and on 28 September 2020 signed with Tondela in the Primeira Liga.

International career
Born in France, Medioub is of Algerian descent. He made his debut with the Algeria national team in a friendly 1–0 win over Nigeria on 9 October 2020.

References

External links

La Preferente Profile
Fora de Jogo Profile

1997 births
Living people
Footballers from Marseille
Algerian footballers
Algeria international footballers
French footballers
French sportspeople of Algerian descent
Association football defenders
Olympique de Marseille players
Granada CF footballers
CP Cacereño players
CD Don Benito players
Club Recreativo Granada players
FC Dinamo Tbilisi players
FC Girondins de Bordeaux players
C.D. Tondela players
Aris Limassol FC players
Ligue 1 players
Primeira Liga players
Erovnuli Liga players
Championnat National 3 players
Algerian expatriate footballers
French expatriate footballers
Algerian expatriate sportspeople in Portugal
Expatriate footballers in Portugal
French expatriate sportspeople in Georgia (country)
Expatriate footballers in Georgia (country)
French expatriate sportspeople in Spain
Expatriate footballers in Spain
French expatriate sportspeople in Cyprus
Algerian expatriate sportspeople in Cyprus
Expatriate footballers in Cyprus